Sphindidae  is a family of beetles, in the suborder Polyphaga. They are also known as slime mold beetles due to their exclusive feeding on slime molds during adult and larval stages, other aspects of their life history are obscure. Palaeontological discoveries since 2015 have added to the geologic history of Sphindidae, including the discovery of Libanopsis, placed in the extinct subfamily Libanopsinae.

Genera
Eight living genera are placed in Sphindidae:
 Aspidiphorus Latreille, 1829
 Carinisphindus McHugh, 1900
 Eurysphindus LeConte, 1878
 Genisphindus McHugh, 1993
 Odontosphindus LeConte, 1878 
 Protosphindus Sen Gupta and Crowson, 1979
 Sphindiphorus Sen Gupta and Crowson, 1979 
 Sphindus Megerle in Dejean, 1821  (cryptic slime mold beetles)
Trematosphindus Li & Cai, 2021, Burmese amber, Myanmar, Late Cretaceous (Cenomanian)
Burmops Kirejtshuk et al. 2019 Burmese amber, Myanmar, Late Cretaceous (Cenomanian)

Additionally the extinct subfamily Libanopsinae contains the genus Libanopsis encompassing five species from Cretaceous Lebanese amber.

References

External links
 Sphindidae Tree of Life
 

 
Cucujoidea families